Mark Barnett (born September 16, 1960) is an American former professional motocross racer. He competed in the AMA Motocross Championships from 1973 to 1981. He was one of the top American motocross racers in the early 1980s and distinctive in being from the Midwest with the limited riding season, winning three consecutive AMA 125cc national championships between 1980 and 1982. He was a rider for team America in the 1983 Motocross des Nations Championship.

Born in Bridgeview, Illinois, Barnett began racing as an amateur in North Judson, Indiana. In 1977 he started racing professionally when he turned sixteen, racing for the Fox Racing team. By 1978 he was hired by the Suzuki factory racing team after starting the season as a privateer. Along with his three national championships, he also won the 1981 AMA Supercross championship. After retiring from competition, he began to design supercross and motocross tracks for pro riders like Ricky Carmichael and Ivan Tedesco. In 2000, Barnett was inducted into the AMA Motorcycle Hall of Fame.

References

1960 births
Living people
People from Bridgeview, Illinois
Sportspeople from Cook County, Illinois
American motocross riders
AMA Motocross Championship National Champions